Ernst Neubach (3 January 1900 – 21 May 1968) was an Austrian screenwriter, producer and director.

Biography
Of Jewish descent, Neubach was a veteran of World War I, after which he worked as a master of ceremonies in Austria, Switzerland and Germany. He wrote lyrics for songs and over 2,000 hits, including I've lost my heart in Heidelberg (1925) and In Heaven There Is No Beer (1956).  Successful operetta librettos include  Gentleman Jack (Music: Carita by Horst).  With the dawn of the talkie era, he began to write screenplays for musical comedies.

After the Nazis seized power in 1933, Neubach lived mostly in Vienna. On 9 March 1937, he became a member of the Patriotic Front.

After the Anschluss, Neubach emigrated to France. There, he worked as a screenwriter from 1938 to 1939. As a member of the French Foreign Legion, he served in North Africa from 1940 to 1941.  On 29 September 1942, he fled to Switzerland to escape the threat of deportation.  He stayed there until three months after the war had ended in a hotel in Zollikon.

In August 1945, Neubach moved back to France. He worked as a scriptwriter in 1948 and in 1952, he returned to Germany, where he worked as a writer. He founded Neubach-Film GmbH in Munich, which produced his 1955 movies.

Neubach married Hertha Helene Langer in July 1945, but the marriage ended in divorce. He later married Margaret Jenni, with whom he had a daughter.

Films directed by Ernst Neubach
 1932 : Trenck, (co-directed by Heinz Paul)
 1949 :  (The Red Signal)
 1949 :  (We request a murderer)
 1951 :  (The Memoirs of Cow Yolande)
 1952 : I Lost My Heart in Heidelberg
 1952 : You Only Live Once
 1955 : The Inn on the Lahn 
 1957 :

Screenplays
 1930 : Vienna, City of Song, directed by Richard Oswald
 1930 : A Student's Song of Heidelberg (co-written with Hans Wilhelm), directed by Karl Hartl
 1930 : The Tender Relatives (co-written with Fritz Friedmann-Frederich), directed by Richard Oswald
 1931 : Der Liebesarzt, directed by Erich Schönfelder
 1931 : Kasernenzauber (dialogue), directed by Carl Boese
 1931 : The Man in Search of His Murderer (play), directed by Robert Siodmak
 1931 : Queen of the Night (co-written with Harry Kahn), directed by Fritz Wendhausen
 1931 : Once I Loved a Girl in Vienna (co-written with Richard Rillo), directed by Erich Schönfelder
 1931 : Weekend in Paradise, directed by Robert Land
 1932 : Two Heavenly Blue Eyes, directed by Johannes Meyer
 1932 : Viennese Waltz (book), directed by Conrad Wiene
 1932 : Trenck (co-written with Heinz Paul), directed by Ernst Neubach and Heinz Paul
 1933 : Keinen Tag ohne Dich, directed by Hans Behrendt
 1933 : A Song Goes Round the World, directed by Richard Oswald
 1934 : When You're Young, the World Belongs to You, directed by Richard Oswald
 1934 : Spring Parade (story), directed by Géza von Bolváry
 1934 : My Song Goes Round the World (story), directed by Richard Oswald
 1935 : Suburban Cabaret, directed by Werner Hochbaum
 1936 : Heut' ist der schönste Tag in meinem Leben (story), directed by Richard Oswald
 1938 : Gibraltar (co-written with Jacques Companeez and Hans Jacoby), directed by Fedor Ozep
 1939 : Personal Column (co-written with Jacques Companeez), directed by Robert Siodmak
 1940 : Serenade (co-written with Jacques Companeez and Max Maret), directed by Jean Boyer
 1946 : That's Not the Way to Die (co-written with André Tabet), directed by Jean Boyer
 1946 : Devil and the Angel (co-written with Jacques Companeez and Louis Ducreux), directed by Pierre Chenal
 1947 : The Marriage of Ramuntcho (co-written with Pierre Apestéguy and André Tabet), directed by Max de Vaucorbeil
 1947 : The Sharks of Gibraltar (co-written with Norbert Carbonnaux and Jacques Companeez), directed by Emil-Edwin Reinert
 1947 :  (co-written with Herbert Victor), directed by Karel Lamač
 1949 :  (co-written with Herbert Victor), directed by Ernst Neubach
 1949 :  (co-written with André Tabet), directed by Ernst Neubach
 1951 :  (co-written with Emil-Edwin Reinert), directed by Ernst Neubach
 1952 : I Lost My Heart in Heidelberg (co-written with Gustav Kampendonk), directed by Ernst Neubach
 1952 : You Only Live Once, directed by Ernst Neubach
 1953 : Mailman Mueller (story), directed by John Reinhardt and Heinz Rühmann
 1953 :  (Whirlwind), directed by Alfred Rode
 1954 : My Sister and I (co-written with Jacques Companeez and Joseph Than), directed by Paul Martin
 1954 : The Big Star Parade (co-written with Franz Tanzler), directed by Paul Martin
 1955 : I Know What I'm Living For (novel and screenplay), directed by Paul Verhoeven
 1955 : Die Wirtin an der Lahn, directed by Johann Alexander Hübler-Kahla
 1956 :  (story), directed by Harald Reinl
 1957 : Aunt Wanda from Uganda, directed by Géza von Cziffra
 1957 :  (story), directed by Harald Reinl
 1957 : , directed by Ernst Neubach
 1958 : A Song Goes Round the World, directed by Géza von Bolváry
 1959 :  (co-written with Adolf Schütz), directed by Arthur Maria Rabenalt
 1960 : The Red Hand, directed by Kurt Meisel
 1966 : Sperrbezirk (story), directed by Will Tremper

Films produced by Neubach
Ernst Neubach had a production company named Neubach-Film.

 1935 : Suburban Cabaret, directed by Werner Hochbaum
 1935 : Ein Walzer um den Stephansturm, directed by Johann Alexander Hübler-Kahla
 1936 : Shadows of the Past (executive producer), directed by Werner Hochbaum
 1946 :  (One Does Not Die That Way) (producer), directed by Jean Boyer
 1947 : , directed by Karel Lamač
 1955 : Ich weiß, wofür ich lebe, directed by Paul Verhoeven
 1955 : Die Wirtin an der Lahn, directed by Johann Alexander Hübler-Kahla
 1956 :  (story), directed by Harald Reinl
 1957 : Aunt Wanda from Uganda, directed by Géza von Cziffra
 1957 :  (story), directed by Harald Reinl
 1957 : , directed by Luis Trenker
 1958 : Worüber man nicht spricht – Frauenarzt Dr. Brand greift ein, directed by Wolfgang Glück
 1958 : A Song Goes Round the World, directed by Géza von Bolváry
 1959 :  (Co-production Neubach/Bavaria), directed by Arthur Maria Rabenalt
 1960 : The Red Hand , directed by Kurt Meisel
 1964 : Dog Eat Dog (Co-production Neubach/Unione Cinematografica Internazionale), directed by Ray Nazarro
 1964 : The Cavern (Co-production Neubach/Cinedoris/20th Century Fox), directed by Edgar G. Ulmer
 1966 : Sperrbezirk, directed by Will Tremper

References

External links 
 
 

1900 births
1968 deaths
Austrian Jews
Austrian film producers
Austrian film directors
French-language film directors
German-language film directors
Writers from Vienna
Soldiers of the French Foreign Legion
Jewish emigrants from Austria after the Anschluss
Austrian male screenwriters
20th-century Austrian screenwriters
20th-century Austrian male writers